Mount Paran Christian School is a private Christian school located in Kennesaw, Georgia, United States. It includes pre-K through 12th grade.

Organization 

Mount Paran Christian School opened in 1976 as a private independent school.

Academics 
MPCS is accredited through the Southern Association of Colleges and Schools (SACS) and School of Advanced International Studies (SAIS).  Mount Paran Christian School offers a full college preparatory program with Honors and Advanced Placement classes, as well as joint enrollment with several area colleges.  Mount Paran incorporates art, music, computer, foreign language, and physical education as regular components of the instructional program, beginning in preschool and extending through high school.

Mount Paran Christian School offers a program for gifted students in second through fourth grade called ENCORE. Entrance into this program is based on testing and teacher recommendations. Advanced classes are offered in math and language arts for 5th-8th grade and accelerated classes starting in 7th grade.

The high school newspaper, The Eagle Eye, is in magazine format and focuses on the school's current events as well as outside news.

Admission 
Mount Paran Christian School's admissions department claims to make admission decisions for prospective students with the following general criteria in mind: faith commitment of the family and applicant, readiness to learn, relevant academic skills, behavioral history, self-motivation, and leadership potential.

Sports 
Mount Paran competes in Georgia High School Association's Region 6-A.
 Baseball
 Basketball
 Cheerleading
 Cross country
 Equestrian
 Football
 Golf
 Lacrosse
 Soccer
 Softball
 Swimming
 Tennis
 Track and field
 Volleyball
 Wrestling

Murray Arts Center 
This arts center, bought by the school, opened in August 2008. Costing $35 million, the complex includes an 800-seat music hall, theater, dance studios and video production facilities.

References

External links 
 Mt. Paran Christian School

Christian schools in Georgia (U.S. state)
Private high schools in Georgia (U.S. state)
Educational institutions established in 1976
Schools in Cobb County, Georgia
Kennesaw, Georgia
Private middle schools in Georgia (U.S. state)
Private elementary schools in Georgia (U.S. state)
Preparatory schools in Georgia (U.S. state)
1976 establishments in Georgia (U.S. state)